Paolo Giacometti (1816–1882) was an Italian dramatist born at Novi Ligure. He was educated in law at Genoa, but at the age of twenty had some success with his play Rosilda and then devoted himself to the stage. Depressed circumstances made him attach himself as author to various touring Italian companies, and his output was considerable; moreover, such actors as Ristori, Rossi and Salvini made many of these plays great successes. Among the best of them were La Donna (1850), La Donna in seconde nozze (1851), Giuditta (1857), Sofocle (1860). La Morte civile (1861). A collection of his works was published at Milan in eight volumes (1859 et seq.).
His Marie Antoinette was written expressly for Ristori, and first staged in New York.

References

External links
 English translation of Elizabeth, Queen of England (1866)

1816 births
1882 deaths
People from Novi Ligure
Italian dramatists and playwrights
19th-century Italian dramatists and playwrights
19th-century male writers